Singla is a Baniya surname. People with this surname include:

 Antoñita Singla (born 1948), Spanish dancer
 Arun Singla (born 1970), Indian cricketer
 Makhan Lal Singla (born 1949), Indian politician
 Sarup Chand Singla (born 1961), Indian politician and businessman
 Sudhir Singla, Indian politician
 Vijay Inder Singla (born 1971), Indian politician

Other uses of Singla are:
 Singla Tea Garden, a village in Darjeeling district, West Bengal, India
  Vimal singla  (born 
1988) in pilibanga, Indian businessman and
Social worker 
  Rohit Singla 
(Born 1992 ) in sangria ,Indian
Businessman 
  Makhan Lal singla 
( Born 1965 ) in sangria , Indian 
Businessman and bhajan singer